Julio Peralta and Horacio Zeballos were the defending champions, but lost in the quarterfinals to Facundo Bagnis and Guillermo Durán.

Rogério Dutra Silva and André Sá won the title, defeating Marcus Daniell and Marcelo Demoliner in the final, 7–6(7–5), 5–7, [10–7].

Seeds

Draw

Draw

References
 Main draw

2017 Brasil Open